The Dominican city of Pedernales is the capital of the Pedernales Province, in the Dominican Republic. It is located in the southwest of the country, on the Dominican Republic–Haiti border, and has a crossing to the  Haitian town of Anse-à-Pitres.

National Parks 
 Parque Nacional Jaragua
 Parque Nacional Sierra de Bahoruco

These two parks, along with Lake Enriquillo and adjoining zones of the Municipality Pedernales, form the first biosphere reserve in the country.

History 

The official foundation of the colony of Pedernales was produced in the year 1927 during the Government of Horacio Vásquez, who appointed as Administrator to the well-known writer Sócrates Nolasco.

The colonists proceeded of Duvergé mostly. The first one was Mr. Genaro Perez Rocha, a prosperous rancher, who would later bring the first resident families who came from Duverge.  In the year 1937 the highway was built to join with this locality and Oviedo, in whose works they participated 500 men divided into brigades of 10 each one.

By Resolution of the City Hall of Enriquillo in the 1938, Pedernales was raised to Municipal District.

The name of Pedernales stems from the denomination Flint that is a variety of very common quartz of yellowish color "that produces spark with the link".  This stone is found in the river of Pedernales, that limit frontier in the south extreme between Haiti and Dominican Republic.

Bahia de las Aguilas

Touristic Places

Hoyo de Pelempito
Cabo Rojo
Río de Paso Sena
El Mulito
Playa Pedernales
Playa Bahia de las Aguilas

Culture
Grupo de Baile Folklórico
Baton Ballet
Banda de Música
Palos y Atabales
Pelea de Gallos

Climate

Its location over a number of rain shadows through the highlands of Hispaniola from the northeasterly trade winds gives Pedernales a semi-arid climate (Köppen BSh). Rainfall is highest in September and October when tropical cyclones may strike the whole island, and temperatures are generally warmer during the day than in much of the tropics.

References 

Municipalities of the Dominican Republic
Populated places in Pedernales Province
Dominican Republic–Haiti border crossings